D.I.S.C.O. is the 1980 debut album by the pop music duo Ottawan. It includes the single D.I.S.C.O.

Track listing

References

1980 debut albums
Ottawan albums